The Otway Range Assassin Spider (Zephyrarchaea porchi) is a species of spider in the family Archaeidae. It is endemic to Victoria, Australia.

Taxonomy 
The holotype for the species was collected near the Cape Otway Lighthouse by Dr. Nicholas Porch. The species-specific name is a patronym in his honor.

Description 
The length of the spider is 2.77 mm.

Distribution and habitat 
It is found only in the Otway Range, north of Cape Otway. The only known specimen was caught in a eucalypt forest with a dense bracken fern understory.

Conservation 
The abundance of protected forests near the type locality suggest that the spider is unlikely of meriting conservation concern.

References 

Spiders described in 2012
Archaeidae